Scotussa or Skotoussa ( or Σκοτοῦσα or Σκοτοτοῦσαι) was a town and polis (city-state) of Pelasgiotis in ancient Thessaly, lying between Pherae and Pharsalus, near the frontiers of Phthiotis. Scotussa is not mentioned in Homer, but according to some accounts the oracle of Dodona in Epirus originally came from this place. In 394 BCE, the Scotussaei joined the other Thessalians in opposing the march of Spartan king Agesilaus II through their country. In 367 BCE, Scotussa was treacherously seized by Alexander of Pherae, tyrant of the neighbouring town of Pherae. 

In the territory of Scotussa were the hills called Cynoscephalae, which are memorable as the scene of two battles, one fought in 364 BCE, between the Thebans and Alexander of Pherae, in which Pelopidas was slain, and the other, of still greater celebrity, fought in 197 BCE, in which Philip V of Macedon was defeated by the Roman consul Titus Quinctius Flamininus. In 191 BCE Scotussa surrendered to Antiochus III, but was recovered shortly afterwards, along with Pharsalus and Pherae, by the consul Manius Acilius Glabrio.

Scotussa's site is at Agia Triada in the municipality of Farsala.

References

Former populated places in Greece
Thessalian city-states
Pelasgiotis